Vahsel Glacier is a glacier on the northwestern side of Heard Island in the southern Indian Ocean. It flows west into South West Bay, between Erratic Point and Cape Gazert. Immediately to the north of Vahsel Glacier is Schmidt Glacier, whose terminus is located between Mount Drygalski and North West Cornice. To the south of Vahsel Glacier is Allison Glacier, whose terminus is located south of Cape Gazert, which separates Allison Glacier from Vahsel Glacier. Click here to see a map of Vahsel Glacier and the northwestern coast of Heard Island.

Discovery and naming
Vahsel Glacier was charted in 1902 by the German Antarctic Expedition under Erich von Drygalski. A landing party was sent ashore near Atlas Cove on 3 February 1902. Drygalski named the glacier for Richard Vahsel, an officer of the landing party of the Gauss expedition who conducted investigations near Atlas Cove. Vahsel was later captain of Wilhelm Filchner's Deutschland; he died in August 1912 during the drift of the Deutschland.

References

Further reading

External links
Click here to see a map of Heard Island and McDonald Islands, including all major topographical features
Australian Antarctic Division
Australian Antarctic Gazetteer
Composite Gazetteer of Antarctica
Australian Antarctic Names and Medals Committee (AANMC)
United States Geological Survey, Geographic Names Information System (GNIS)
Scientific Committee on Antarctic Research (SCAR)

Glaciers of Heard Island and McDonald Islands